Malik is a 2021 Indian Malayalam-language political thriller film directed, written and edited by Mahesh Narayanan. It was produced by Anto Joseph through Anto Joseph Film Company along with Carnival Movie Network. The film stars Fahadh Faasil with Nimisha Sajayan,  Vinay Forrt Jalaja, Joju George, Dileesh Pothan and Indrans in supporting roles. The music was composed by Sushin Shyam.

Principal photography began on 3 September 2019 and completed on 18 January 2020, with major portions filmed across Kochi, Thiruvananthapuram and Lakshadweep. Cinematography was handled by Sanu John Varghese. The film's theatrical release was postponed multiple times due to COVID-19 pandemic, and was later opted for an OTT release through Amazon Prime Video on 15 July 2021. The plot of the film might be loosely based on the 2009 Beemapally police shooting.

The theatrical release of Malik was delayed due to the COVID-19 pandemic. The film was released on Amazon Prime Video on 15 July 2021 as a result of non-existent theatrical releases due to COVID-19 pandemic. It received acclaim from critics praising the characterisation and performances of the lead cast members especially that of Faasil's performance with many critics saying it as his career's best, direction, story, screenplay, music, cinematography and other major technical aspects of the film.

Plot 
The film follows a non-linear narrative.

Ahammadali Sulaiman is the godfather of Ramadapally, a coastal town in Thiruvananthapuram where Muslims and Christians live together. He prepares to undertake the Hajj pilgrimage in his middle years on the insistence of his Christian wife Roselyn. Ali and his friend Aboobacker, a political leader, are on the verge of fallout over land acquisition from the locals for a harbour project. At the airport, the police arrest Ali under the Terrorist and Disruptive Activities (Prevention) Act (TADA).

The police assign Shibu, a goon to kill Ali in custody extrajudicially but he dies in an explosion. They then intimidate Freddy, a juvenile arrested for throwing steel bombs at the police, into doing it. Freddy is the son of David Christudas, Roselyn's elder brother and Sulaiman's nephew. David was a friend of Ali's but now holds a grudge against him.

On the police's insistence, Ali's mother Jameela meets Freddy. In the 1960s, the Muslims and Christians of Ramadapally lived in harmony. The Christian fishermen community primarily lived in its Edavathura suburb. Ali, David, Peter and Hameed dropped out of school and engaged in petty crimes, working for Chandran, a local goon. Chandran disowned them after Ali sends trash dumped at the local mosque back to the disposers. Ali and his friends started smuggling on their own and he sets up his own shop.

Ali's earnestness impressed the sub-collector Anwar Ali. Ali asked Anwar to clear the garbage dump and build a school there. Wanting to settle scores, Chandran sets fire to their godown and the children working there die. Ali kills Chandran in retaliation. Anwar questions Ali, who confesses to his crime, and challenges Anwar to arrest him before Ramadapally's residents. Forced to leave, Anwar extracted a promise from Jameela to testify against Ali. Jameela asks Freddy not to kill Ali and says he should be brought before the law. David and his wife visit Freddy in jail and Freddy enquires why David hates Ali.

A look out notice was issued against Ali and he absconded to Minicoy, Lakshadweep along with David and Roselyn. Ali and Roselyn are married with David's approval. Ali gained Roselyn's approval to raise their children as Muslims. When David returned to the coast, David's father told him that the police beat their men and raped their women. Anwar told David that the Muslims reaped the benefits and the consequences were suffered by the coastal Christian fishermen. David was appalled but conflicted. He convinced Ali to appear before the court. Ali's mother gave a statement against Ali and he was remanded for three months. Roselyn gave birth to a boy who David named Antony and performed his baptism. When Ali is released, he interrupts the ritual and shouts at David. He names his son Ameer. David is aggrieved and ends his friendship with Ali.

Ali received a consignment of smuggled weapons which he refused and hid under a pit. The 2004 Indian Ocean earthquake strikes and causes disproportionate losses to the Christian fishermen community there. Ali engages in the humanitarian efforts. He continually opposes development projects that displace the locals. Anwar, the police, and MLA P. A. Aboobacker, who is playing both sides for the land acquisition, manipulated David into starting a riot at the mosque premises during Uroos celebrations. Aboo's goons murder a fellow and pin it on David, leading to a fight between Christians and Muslims. Ameer was killed in police firing. Some of the local goons use the hidden weapons and a bloody riot occurs. Ali's supporters ride a car over Anwar. David is shot by Ali's goons and becomes disabled.

David and his wife ask Freddy to follow through with his task. He is transferred into Ali's cell. Freddy attempts to strangle Ali during Fajr prayer but fails. Ali breaks down and blames David for his son's death and the riots. Ali suffers a panic attack. The jail doctor arrives and strangles Ali, declaring him dead by suicide. The doctor is Anwar's daughter, who is bedridden with full-body paralysis.

Freddy is released from jail and enters the mosque where Ali's last rites are performed. He throws a stone at Aboobacker who was inciting communal violence in Ali's name. In a mid-credits scene, Anwar reveals to the media that the riots at Ramadapally were instigated by the police with the help of the government.

Cast

Production

Development 
Following Take Off (2017), Mahesh Narayanan started working on his second directorial with Dulquer Salmaan in the lead. However, that project was put on hold and he moved on to another film. In May 2019, it was reported that Mahesh has cast Fahadh Faasil and Parvathy Thiruvothu in his new film, whom he had directed in Take Off. Sanu John Varghese was hired as cinematographer and Sushin Shyam as the composer, who revealed the film's title as Malik. The filmmakers announced an ensemble cast of Biju Menon, Nimisha Sajayan, Vinay Forrt, Jalaja, Dileesh Pothan and Indrans being part of the project, while Menon was replaced by Joju George in December. It was reportedly made under an estimated budget of  crore, becoming Fahadh's most expensive film to date. According to Narayan, "at its core, Malik is a political thriller".

Characters 
Reports had claimed that Fahadh plays a role of a politician named Sulaimaan Malik. His role was rumoured to be similar of Michael Corleone in The Godfather (1972) portrayed by Al Pacino or Velu Naicker in Nayakan (1987) portrayed by Kamal Haasan. But Narayanan said that his role is based on a real-life person who died in 1986. Since the plot is based on land acquisition cases in the coastal regions of Thiruvananthapuram in Kerala, Mahesh had stated that "The film revolves around a place where there was a resistance against this constant threat of displacement of a minority community, and a person who was responsible for making his people rise up", further describing his character as "someone who emerged as a leader among the community".

The film revolves around Sulaimaan's character spanning from the age of 21 to 58, and Fahadh shed 10 to 15 kilograms, for the younger version of his character. The aged Sulaimaan's look was inspired by Faasil's grandfather. It was after experimenting with different looks that Mahesh zeroed in on Fahadh's grandfather. He said the "biggest challenge" of Fahadh was to shoot the younger portions, as he had to lose weight. The film was shot chronologically from aged to young as he lost weight.

Filming 
Principal photography began on 3 September 2019 in Fort Kochi. Production designer Santhosh Raman recreated an entire coastal town in Kalamassery replicating 1980s, where a major part of the film was shot, and another set was created in Thiruvananthapuram. Since the film has large crowd scenes and handling crowd in real locations is difficult, they shot the film in a fictional location created by them, in a controlled environment. Hollywood stunt choreographer Lee Whittaker was part of the crew. Filming was completed on 18 January 2020 and post-production works began soon after its completion. The team took two months for visual effects and 95 percent of post-production works were completed before the COVID-19 pandemic lockdown in India. The team resumed the work later in May 2020.

Music 

The music is composed, produced and arranged by Sushin Shyam with lyrics penned by Anwar Ali and Sameer Binsi.

An album containing the background score for the film was released separately by Anto Joseph Film Company in 2021. It contains instrumental pieces by Sushin Shyam.

Release 
The film was initially scheduled for theatrical release in April 2020, but was postponed due to the COVID-19 pandemic in India. Unlike other South Indian films, which opted for a digital release during the pandemic, the producers of Malik waited for a theatrical release refuting offers from OTT platforms. In December 2020, a new release date of 13 May 2021 (Eid-al-Fitr weekend) was announced, with Narayanan stating that he hopes audience may start coming to theatres by April and May. The film was censored by the Central Board of Film Certification in December 2020, along with 46 other Malayalam films.

Theatrical release was delayed again due to the second wave of COVID-19. Fahadh Faasil said that the decision was collective. Malik became the one of most-awaited theatrical releases to have a direct online release, following Drishyam 2. The film was released on 15 July 2021 on Prime Video.

The film has been invited at the 51st International Film Festival Rotterdam to be held from 26 January to 6 February 2022.

Reception 
Malik received critical acclaim from critics, most of them praising the performance of cast, direction and cinematography. The review aggregator Rotten Tomatoes reported that 90% of critics have given the film a positive review based on ten reviews, with an average rating of 6.90/10. Sushin Shyam's composition and score also earned a positive response.

The Times of India rated 3 out of 5 and wrote: "At a running time of 160 minutes, there are moments when the film lags and bits that seem a bit of a stretch and unclear ... The film is a bit long and has some confusing bits, but on the positive side, Malik reflects important issues of our times in a compelling manner". Firstpost rated 4 out of 5 and said that it is "a grand, gripping saga on tricky communal ground ... this is a challenging film, demanding as much from the viewer as it offers. Glancing away for a second could cost you, which is fair enough, but in one sphere the script could have done better", also praised the acting. The Hindu stated that the film is a "multi-layered mass entertainer, with fantastic character arcs and performances ... The script subtly looks at how extremists as well as power-hungry elements in every religion try to create and widen fissures with other communities", and also appreciated the cinematography and score. Baradwaj Rangan of Film Companion South wrote "Malik follows the Godfather template but the various touches given to characters and events percolate all the way down to make the film a very local one...Malik is one of those movies that would continue to reveal as you rewatch it because it’s densely packed with information. It’s a spectacle, not a grand spectacle but an intimate one. Malik proves that often great cinema is not about what’s being told but instead about how it’s told. In other words, form is more important than content."

The Federal wrote: "The cinematic craft behind ‘Malik’ towers over everything else ... It is a long-drawn-out, complex film with a significant political statement to make ... Though the director denies it, the film seems to be clearly linked to the 2009 Beemapally police shooting. The News Minute rated 4 out of 5 and wrote: "Malik appears to be loosely based on the Beemapally riots of 2009 ... The plot examines the relationship between religion, politics, gender and individual ambitions. It’s a complicated mix, but Mahesh steers the screenplay expertly, without plunging the viewer into confusion".

Differences from history

In reality, the Home Department and Police under the then Home Minister Kodiyeri Balakrishnan in leftist government led by V. S. Achuthanandan were responsible for the 2009 Beemapally police shooting. A Judicial Commission was setup to probe the shooting it was found that the mob had tried to attack a Christian Church which was housing about 50 people. This was what led to the shooting. According to the report the mob also thrown bombs at the police. The judicial commission report rejected allegations that the police firing is unjustifiable and concluded that it was the police action which prevented a large scale communal riot.

Accolades

References

External links 
 

2021 films
2021 thriller films
Amazon Prime Video original films
Films directed by Mahesh Narayanan
Films not released in theaters due to the COVID-19 pandemic
Indian political thriller films
Indian interfaith romance films
Films shot in Thiruvananthapuram
Films shot in Kochi
Films about religious violence in India
Fictional portrayals of the Kerala Police
Films scored by Sushin Shyam